Idiot refers to a mentally deficient person.

Idiot may also refer to:

Idiot (1992 film), by Mani Kaul
Idiot (2002 film), by Puri Jagannadh
Idiot (2012 film), by Rajib Biswas
Idiot (2021 film), by Rambhala

See also
 Idiots (film), a 2012 film by K. S. Bava
 The Idiot (disambiguation)